Metnitz is a town in the district of Sankt Veit an der Glan in the Austrian state of Carinthia.

Geography
Metnitz lies in the north of Carinthia and includes most of the Metnitz valley and the surrounding Gurktal Alps.

References

Cities and towns in Sankt Veit an der Glan District